The 2005 Czech Figure Skating Championships were held in Ostrava between December 16 and 19, 2004. Skaters competed in the disciplines of men's singles, ladies' singles, and ice dancing.

Senior results

Men

Ladies

Ice dancing

External links
 results

2004 in figure skating
Czech Figure Skating Championships, 2005
Czech Figure Skating Championships
2005 in Czech sport